Zechariah 12 is the twelfth of the total 14 chapters in the Book of Zechariah in the Hebrew Bible and the Old Testament of the Christian Bible. This book contains the prophecies attributed to the prophet Zechariah, and is a part of the Book of the Twelve Minor Prophets. This chapter is a part of a section (so-called "Second Zechariah") consisting of Zechariah 9–14. This chapter and chapter 13 verses 1–6 are a section, forming a three-section "entity" with 13:7–9 and 14:1-21.

Text
The original text was written in the Hebrew language. This chapter is divided into 14 verses.

Textual witnesses
Some early manuscripts containing the text of this chapter in Hebrew are of the Masoretic Text, which includes the Codex Cairensis (from year 895), the Petersburg Codex of the Prophets (916), Aleppo Codex (930), and Codex Leningradensis (1008). Fragments containing parts of this chapter were found among the Dead Sea Scrolls, including 4Q80 (4QXIIe; 75–50 BCE) with extant verses 7–12. and 4Q82 (4QXIIg; 50–25 BCE) with extant verses 1–3.

There is also a translation into Koine Greek known as the Septuagint, made in the last few centuries BCE. Extant ancient manuscripts of the Septuagint version include Codex Vaticanus (B; B; 4th century), Codex Sinaiticus (S; BHK: S; 4th century), Codex Alexandrinus (A; A; 5th century) and Codex Marchalianus (Q; Q; 6th century).

Structure
NKJV groups this chapter into:
 = The Coming Deliverance of Judah
 = Mourning for the Pierced One

The Coming Deliverance of Judah (12:1–9)
This section contains the oracle focusing on 'the final onslaught of all nations on Jerusalem.'

Verse 1
The burden of the word of the Lord against Israel. Thus says the Lord, who stretches out the heavens, lays the foundation of the earth, and forms the spirit of man within him:
"Burden": here means "oracle" or "prophecy".
This verse contains the heading of the oracle which 'seems to cover the whole of the rest of
the book' (chapters 12–14), with a 'doxology on creation' bringing ideas about "creation and origins" (the Urzeit) projected forwards onto the "end of
time" (the Endzeit).

Mourning for the Pierced One (12:10–14)
The mourning in this section is based on the piercing of Yahweh, who is the only one speaking in first person throughout chapters 12 to 14; first compared to the loss of an only (or firstborn) son (verse 10), then to the death of king Josiah in the "plain of Megiddo" (verse 11; cf. 2 Chronicles 35:20–25; 2 Kings 23:29–30; traced to Jeremiah in 2 Chronicles 35:25); and the mourning spreading from Jerusalem to the entire land (verse 12) following by the references to particular subgroups or clans in the community even further according to the gender ("wives" separated from the "husbands"; verses 12–14).

Verse 10

 "They shall look upon me whom they have pierced" The speaker in first person is Yahweh (throughout chapters 12 to 14). To "look upon or unto" implies trust, longing, and reverence (compare ; ;).  For some preterist interpreters of the New Testament, the literal fulfilment of this piercing, i.e. slaying happened when the Romans crucified Jesus, such as Paul wrote about the crucifixion of "the Lord of glory", and requested the Ephesian elders to "feed the Church of God, which he hath purchased with his own blood"; also John links these words to the same event (cf. Revelation 1:7). The Greek Septuagint renders , "They shall look to me because they insulted," whereas Vulgate has Aspicient ad me quem confixerunt. A suffering Messiah was described earlier in Zechariah as a despised and ill-treated shepherd, and a little further on  that he is stricken with the sword. The prophecies of Isaiah have as well the same notion (Isaiah 53, etc.). With this notion the prophet, by inspiration, acknowledges the two natures in the one Person of Messiah, as Isaiah (Isaiah 9:6) called him the "Mighty God," and the psalmists often speak to the same effect (etc.; cf. Micah 5:2). The "looking to" the stricken Messiah is signified when those watching the crucifixion beat their breasts.
 "Me … him": The change of person is due to Yahweh-Messiah speaking in His own person first, then the prophet speaking of "him". Later Jewish literature refers the "pierced" one to be Messiah Ben (son of) Joseph, who was to suffer in the battle with Gog, before Messiah Ben David should come to reign. The Hebrew word is always used of a literal piercing (so ).
 "As one mourneth for his only son... for his firstborn": The depth and poignancy of this mourning are expressed by a double comparison, the grief felt at the loss of an only son, and of the firstborn. Among the Hebrews the preservation of the family was deemed of vast importance, and its extinction regarded as a punishment and a curse, so that the death of an only son would be the heaviest blow that could happen (see ;). Peculiar privileges belonged to the firstborn, and his loss would be estimated accordingly (see ; ;). The mention of "piercing," just above, seems to connect the passage with the Passover solemnities and the destruction of the firstborn of the Egyptians.
 "In bitterness for him": as one that is "in bitterness for his firstborn".

Verse 11

 "The mourning of (at) Hadadrimmon in the valley of Megiddon": This is generally supposed to refer to the death of King Josiah of a wound received at Megiddo, in the battle with Pharaoh-Necho (609 BC), and to the national lamentation made for him, long observed on the anniversary of the calamity (see). Jerome identified Hadadrimmon with a place in the Plain of Megiddo, near Jezreel, and known in his day by the name of Maximianopolis, now Rummaneh, seven miles northwest of Jezreel, on the southern edge of the Plain of Esdraelon, but the identification is far from certain.

Verse 12

 "David... Nathan" First the royal family is mentioned generally, to show that no one, however, high in station, is exempted from this mourning; and then a particular branch is named to individualize the lamentation. Nathan is that son of David from whom descended Zerubbabel.
 "Nathan": A branch from Nathan, a son of David and whole brother of Solomon , in the ancestral line of Jesus.
 "Their wives apart." In private life the females of a household dwelt in apartments separate from the males, and in public functions the genders were equally kept distinct (see ; ;).

Verse 13

 "Levi... Shimei": The priestly family is generally mentioned first, and then individualized by naming Shimei, the son of Gershon, and grandson of Levi. The LXX (Septuagint), Syriac Peshitta, and Arabic versions, read "the family of Simeon" or "the tribe of Simeon," instead of "the family of Shimei," but there is no known reason to mention this tribe. In one sense, this prophecy began to be fulfilled when a great company of priests were converted by the preaching of the apostles. These names are also found in a branch from Nathan, a son of David and whole brother of Solomon, which was in the ancestral line of Jesus (: "(23) Jesus... the son of Joseph,... (24) ... the son of Levi, ... (26) ...the son of Semei, ...(29) ... the son of Levi, ... (30) ... the son of Simeon, ... (31) ... the son of Nathan, which was the son of David").

See also

Related Bible parts: 2 Samuel 5, 1 Chronicles 3, Psalm 22, Isaiah 53, Matthew 27, Luke 3, John 19, Revelation 1, Revelation 16

Notes and references

Sources

External links

Jewish
Zechariah 12 Hebrew with Parallel English
Zechariah 12 Hebrew with Rashi's Commentary

Christian
Zechariah 12 English Translation with Parallel Latin Vulgate 

12